Kannur South railway station (station code: CS) is a railway station in Kannur district, Kerala, and falls under the Palakkad railway division of the Southern Railway zone, Indian Railways.

Train services 
Towards Calicut: Kannur–Coimbatore Fast Passenger, Mangaluru–Calicut Passenger, Kannur–Shornur Passenger, Kannur–Calicut Passenger

Towards Kannur: Calicut–Kannur Passenger, Trissur–Kannur Passenger, Calicut–Kannur Passenger, Coimbatore–Kannur Fast Passenger

Railway stations in Kannur district
Railway stations opened in 1904
1904 establishments in India